Buturlinovka is a military air base of the Russian Air Force in Buturlinovsky District, Voronezh Oblast, Russia.

History
Historically, Buturlinovka housed the 186th Instructional Shturmovik Aviation Regiment operating 45 Sukhoi Su-25 jet aircraft were stationed there during the early 1990s, and later became home to the 899th Orshansky Guards Assault Aviation Regiment of the 16th Air Army operating Su-25s until the unit disbanded on 1 December 2009, after which the airbase was left vacant. It remained an air commandant's office until June 2014, when it was announced that the 899th Orshansky Guards would be re-established by 2017.

During 2011, the Mikoyan MiG-29's stationed at Kursk Vostochny Airport were temporarily based at Buturlinovka for a year due to runway repairs. From December 2013, the airfield temporarily accommodated the 47th Voronezh Mixed Aviation Regiment from Voronezh Malshevo during the repair of the runway.

From April 2022 some Russian military aircraft deployed to bases in Belarus moved to this base as part of the 2022 Russian invasion of Ukraine such as the 277th Bomber Aviation Regiment which deployed to Lida (air base) from their home base at Komsomolsk-on-Amur Airport.

References

Soviet Air Force bases
Soviet Frontal Aviation
Russian Air Force bases